Debris is the fifth EP by Battery, self-released in 1999.

Reception
Industrial Reviews gave Debris two stars out of five and criticized the compositions for not matching the quality of Battery's past releases.

Track listing

Personnel
Adapted from the Debris liner notes.

Battery
 Maria Azevedo – lead vocals
 Shawn Brice – instruments
 Evan Sornstein (Curium Design) – instrument

Release history

References

External links 
 Debris at Discogs (list of releases)

1999 EPs
Battery (electro-industrial band) albums